Full Force Nature is an American documentary television series that is narrated by Bill Ratner and ran on The Weather Channel from January 15, 2006 until 2011.

Premise
Full Force Nature focuses on extreme weather and weird weather events that are caught on video camera.

Episode list

Season 1

Home media and streaming releases
On April 28, 2009, Echo Bridge Home Entertainment (under license from GRB Entertainment) released the show on DVD in Region 1.

On January 25, 2010, Echo Bridge Home Entertainment (under license from GRB Entertainment) released both volumes of Full Force Nature on DVD in Region 1.

On December 20, 2016, GRB Entertainment made the show available for streaming on YouTube.

In 2018, the series was available online on the streaming services Netflix and Tubi, but the show was later removed on Netflix in 2019 and Tubi in 2020.

, the show is currently available for streaming online on Pluto TV in Latin America and Vix in the United States and Mexico, under the titles Fuerza Total de la Naturaleza and Naturaleza Impacable, both dubbed in Spanish.

International versions
The Philippine version of the show was hosted by actor Richard Gutierrez, and aired on GMA Network under the "Bilib Ka Ba? Nights" block of the network from December 2, 2008 until February 17, 2009.

See also
 Deadline to Disaster - a similar documentary television show that aired on The Weather Channel since 2020.

References

External links
 
 
 

The Weather Channel original programming
2006 American television series debuts
2011 American television series endings
2000s American documentary television series
2010s American documentary television series
English-language television shows
Television series by GRB Entertainment